The Mark 83 is part of the Mark 80 series of low-drag general-purpose bombs in United States service.

Development and deployment

The Mk 83 is a streamlined steel casing containing  of tritonal high explosive. When filled with PBXN-109 thermally insensitive explosive, the bomb is designated BLU-110.

The Mk 83/BLU-110 is used as the warhead for a variety of precision-guided weapons, including the GBU-16 Paveway laser-guided bombs, the GBU-32 JDAM and Quickstrike sea mines.

The Mk 83 is also used as the warhead in a variety of Pakistani smart bombs made by GIDS. During Operation Swift Retort in 2019, 2 JF-17 Thunders of the No. 16 Squadron "Black Panthers" armed with newly developed Mk. 83 Range Extension Kit (REK) bombs struck military targets in Indian Held Kashmir.

This bomb is most typically used by the United States Navy but is used by the USAF in the F-22A in a JDAM configuration. According to a test report conducted by the United States Navy's Weapon System Explosives Safety Review Board (WSESRB) established in the wake of the 1967 USS Forrestal fire, the cooking-off time for a Mk 83 is approximately 8 minutes 40 seconds.

See also
Mark 81 bomb
Mark 82 bomb
Mark 84 bomb
FAB-500 – Soviet counterpart

References

External links
Mk83 General-Purpose Bomb

Cold War aerial bombs of the United States
Aerial bombs of the United States
Military equipment introduced in the 1960s